The hairy Atlantic spiny rat (Trinomys setosus) is a spiny rat species from South America. It is endemic to Brazil.

References

Trinomys
Mammals of Brazil
Endemic fauna of Brazil
Mammals described in 1817
Taxa named by Anselme Gaëtan Desmarest